Masego Montsho (born 15 June 1991) is a Motswana footballer who plays as a defender for Botswana Defence Force XI FC and the Botswana women's national team.

Club career
Montsho has played for Botswana Defence Force XI in Botswana.

International career
Montsho capped for Botswana at senior level during the 2016 Africa Women Cup of Nations qualification and the 2021 COSAFA Women's Championship.

See also
List of Botswana women's international footballers

References

1991 births
Living people
Botswana women's footballers
Women's association football defenders
Botswana Defence Force XI F.C. players
Botswana women's international footballers